The 1999 International Raiffeisen Grand Prix was a men's tennis tournament played on Clay in St. Pölten, Austria that was part of the World Series of the 1999 ATP Tour. It was the nineteenth edition of the tournament and was held from 17 May until 23 May 1999. Second-seeded Marcelo Ríos won the singles title.

Finals

Singles

 Marcelo Ríos defeated  Mariano Zabaleta, 4–4, retired.

Doubles

 Andrew Florent /  Andrei Olhovskiy defeated  Brent Haygarth /  Robbie Koenig, 5–7, 6–4, 7–5.

References

International Raiffeisen Grand Prix
Hypo Group Tennis International
May 1999 sports events in Europe
Hypo